Pougny—Chancy station is a railway station in the commune of Pougny, in the French department of Ain, in the Auvergne-Rhône-Alpes region. It is located at the border between France and Switzerland and is an intermediate stop on the Lyon–Geneva line of SNCF.

Services
The following services stop at Pougny—Chancy:

See also 

 List of SNCF stations in Auvergne-Rhône-Alpes

References

External links 
 

Railway stations in Ain
Lyon–Geneva railway